Alberto Soto Pacheco (born January 18, 1990) is a football defender currently playing for Santos Laguna, in the Primera División de México.

Soto began his career in the Santos Laguna youth teams, until he finally managed to break into the first team at the age of 18. His debut came against Chiapas, as Santos lost 3–1.

Alberto has also been capped once for the Mexico U-17 squad, playing in the Pre-mundial sub-17 held in Honduras, against Haiti.

External links
 

1990 births
Living people
Footballers from Coahuila
Mexican footballers
Liga MX players
Santos Laguna footballers
Association football defenders
Sportspeople from Torreón